The Quick Gun is a 1964 American Techniscope Western film directed by Sidney Salkow and starring Audie Murphy. It was the second of four films produced by Grant Whytock and Edward Small's  Admiral Pictures in the 1960s.

The film's screenplay was based on Steve Fisher's short story The Fastest Gun that had previously provided the story for two other westerns Top Gun (1955) starring Sterling Hayden and Noose for a Gunman (1960) starring  Jim Davis and Ted de Corsia as the villain; both for United Artists. Fisher at this time was also providing the screenplay's for a series of A.C. Lyles second feature Techniscope Westerns for Paramount Pictures.

Plot
Gunfighter Clint Cooper (Audie Murphy) returns to his hometown of Shelby, Montana after two years. He left Shelby in disgrace after killing the town's two hot-tempered but inexperienced young men in self-defense. The father of the young men, Tom Morrison (Walter Sande) feels that Cooper murdered them. Cooper plans to settle down in Shelby to claim his recently deceased father's ranch and marry his old girlfriend, Helen (Merry Anders), the town's schoolteacher.

On the way to Shelby he runs into his old gang, led by Spangler (Ted de Corsia), who plan on not only robbing the town but burning it to the ground and having their way with its womenfolk. Spangler believes his former friend Clint is himself intending to rob Shelby's bank full of money from large cattle sales. Spangler seeks Clint to join his band of 15 men with the motivation of revenging himself on the town that exiled him or else he won't leave alive. Clint breaks free, killing two of his pursuers.

Clint arrives in Shelby to find all of the town's young men have left on a cattle drive. He tries to warn the town of the impending robbery, but everyone except the sheriff, an old friend of his called Scotty (James Best), and old coot Dan Evans (Frank Ferguson) still hates Clint and wants him to leave. Despite this welcome, Clint eventually agrees to help Scotty defend the town against the gang, though Clint discovers that Helen will marry Scotty in a week's time. Meanwhile, Tom and his nephew Rick (Rex Holman) scheme to kill Clint by making it look like self-defense.

Cast
 Audie Murphy as Clint Cooper
 Merry Anders as Helen Reed
 James Best as Scotty Grant
 Ted de Corsia as Jud Spangler
 Walter Sande as Tom Morrison
 Rex Holman as Rick Morrison
 Charles Meredith as Reverend Staley
 Frank Ferguson as Dan Evans
 Mort Mills as Cagle
 Gregg Palmer as Donovan
 Frank Gerstle as George Keely
 Stephen Roberts as Dr. Stevens
 Paul Bryar as Mitchell 
 Raymond Hatton as Elderly Man
 William Fawcett as Mike

Production
Murphy was paid $37,500 for his performance.

Quotes
Your guns have gotten too fast and too sudden. And from what I hear about your reputation, they have gotten a lot faster and suddener in the last two years. - Sheriff Scotty Grant

See also
List of American films of 1964

References

External links
 
 
 
 
 The Quick Gun at The Movie Scene

1964 films
1964 Western (genre) films
American Western (genre) films
Audie Murphy
Columbia Pictures films
Films set in Montana
Remakes of American films
1960s English-language films
Films directed by Sidney Salkow
Films scored by Richard LaSalle
1960s American films